This is complete list of works by American science fiction and fantasy novelist Tracy Hickman.

Novels

Dragonlance 

Chronicles:
Dragons of Autumn Twilight 1 (1984)
Dragons of Winter Night 1 (1985)
Dragons of Spring Dawning 1 (1985)
Legends:
Time of the Twins 1 (1986)
War of the Twins 1 (1986)
Test of the Twins 1 (1986)
The Second Generation 1 (1995)
Dragons of Summer Flame 1 (1996)
Dragonlance Tales:
The Magic of Krynn 1 (1987) 
Kender, Gully Dwarves, and Gnomes 1  (1987)
Love and War 1  (1987)
The War of Souls:
Dragons of a Fallen Sun 1 (2000) (Winner of the 2000 Origins Award for Best Game-Related Novel)
Dragons of a Lost Star 1 (2001)
Dragons of a Vanished Moon 1 (2002)
The Lost Chronicles:
Dragons of the Dwarven Depths 1 (2006)
Dragons of the Highlord Skies 1 (2007)
Dragons of the Hourglass Mage 1 (2009)
Young Adult Chronicles:
A Rumor of Dragons 1 (2003)
Night of the Dragons 1 (2003)
The Nightmare Lands 1 (2003)
To the Gates of Palanthas 1 (2003)
Hope's Flame 1 (2004)
A Dawn of Dragons 1 (2004)

Darksword 

Forging the Darksword 1 (1987)
Doom of the Darksword 1 (1988)
Triumph of the Darksword 1 (1988)
Legacy of the Darksword 1 (1997)

Rose of the Prophet 

The Will of the Wanderer 1 (1988)
Paladin of the Night 1 (1989)
The Prophet of Akhran 1 (1989)

Death Gate Cycle 

Dragon Wing 1 (1990)
Elven Star 1 (1991)
Fire Sea 1 (1992)
Serpent Mage 1 (1993)
The Hand of Chaos 1 (1993)
Into the Labyrinth 1 (1994)
The Seventh Gate 1 (1995)

Songs of the Stellar Wind 

Requiem of the Stars  (1996)

Starshield 

Starshield: Sentinels 1  (1996)
Nightsword 1  (1998)
Dedrak's Quest (1998)

StarCraft 

StarCraft: Speed Of Darkness (2002)

Sovereign Stone 

Well of Darkness 1 (2000)
Guardians of the Lost 1 (2001)
Journey into the Void 1 (2003)

Bronze Canticles 

Mystic Warrior 2 (2004)
Mystic Quest 2 (2005)
Mystic Empire 2 (2006)

Dragonships of Vindras 

Bones of the Dragon 1 (2009)
Secret of the Dragon 1 (March 2010)
Rage of the Dragon 1 (April 2012)
Doom of the Dragon 1 (January 5, 2016)

The Annals of Drakis 
Song of the Dragon (Jul 2010)
Citadels of the Lost (Jul 2011)
Blood of the Emperor (Jul 2012)

Dragon's Bard 
Eventide 2 (Dec 2010 / June 2012)
Blackshore 2 (2013)
Moredale 2 (unpublished)
St. Nicholas and the Dragon2 (2012)

Blade of the Avatar series 
 The Sword of Midras: A Shroud of the Avatar Novel (2016, with Richard Garriott)
 The Eye of Scales: A Shroud of the Avatar Novel (2022, with Richard Garriott)

The Nightbirds 
Unwept 2 (2014)
Unhonored 2 (2016)

Other novels
Shadow Over Nordmaar (1982) under the pen name Dezra Despain
The Immortals  (1996)
Starcraft: Speed of Darkness  (2002)
Fireborn: Embers of Atlantis  (2011)
Wayne of Gotham  (June 2012)
Swept up by the Sea 2 (2013)
Lincoln's Wizard (2015) with Dan Willis

Dragonlance Reference books
 Dragonlance Adventures 1 (1987) - AD&D sourcebook 
 The History of Dragonlance 1 (1995)
 Dragonlance Legends of Twins (2005) with Seth Johnson, Chris Pierson, Aaron Rosenberg, and Margaret Weis
 Leaves from the Inn of the Last Home (1987) - edited with Weis
 More Leaves from the Inn of the Last Home (2000) - edited with Weis

Role-playing game-related
 Darksword Adventures 1 (1988)
 Secrets of Dungeon Mastery 1 (1988)
 XDM: X-Treme Dungeon Mastery 3 (2009)
 Sojourner Tales 2(2013)
 Shroud of the Avatar: Forsaken Virtues (2018)

Anthologies
Margaret Weis & Tracy Hickman present: Treasures of Fantasy (1999) - editor of a collection of short stories
"Heart of Goldmoon" in The Best of Tales (2000) - edited with Weis; story with Kate Novak
"Anvil of Time" in The Best of Tales: Volume 2 (2002) - edited with Weis; sole author of story 
Dragons in the Archives: The Best of Weis & Hickman (2004)
The Players of Gilean: Tales form the World of Krynn 1 (2003), editor
"Here be Dragons" 1 in Dragons: Worlds Afire (2006)

Dragonlance anthologies
Hickman edited these anthologies with Weis.
The Dragons of Krynn (1994)
The Dragons at War (1996)
The Dragons of Chaos (1997)
Dragons of Time (2007)
Relics and Omens: Tales of the Fifth Age (1998)
Heroes and Fools: Tales of the Fifth Age (1999) 
Rebels & Tyrants: Tales of the Fifth Age (2000) 
The Search for Magic: Tales from the War of Souls (2001)

Modules
For Dungeons & Dragons:
Rahasia 2  (1979)
Pharaoh 2  (1980)

For Advanced Dungeons & Dragons:
Ravenloft 2  (1983)
DL series (DL8 - Dragons of War)2 (1984)
Ravenloft II: The House on Gryphon Hill 2 (1986)  - outline and plot

For Top Secret/S.I.
 TS1 - Operation: Starfire (1987) 
 TS2 - The Doomsday Drop (1988) 

For the Serenity Role Playing Game:
Out in the Black 2 (2006)

1 (co-author Margaret Weis)
2 (co-author Laura Hickman)
3 (co-author Curtis Hickman)

References

Bibliographies by writer
Bibliographies of American writers
Fantasy bibliographies
Harold B. Lee Library-related 21st century articles
 
Science fiction bibliographies